Ronan Ryan is an Irish-American businessperson. He is the president of IEX, the Investor's Exchange, and an electronic trading expert. As a founding member of IEX, Ryan was a central character featured in Michael Lewis’ Flash Boys: A Wall Street Revolt.  Irish America magazine named Ryan to its 2014 and 2015 Wall Street 50 list.

Background 
Born and raised in Dublin, he moved to America in 1990, when he was 16.

Ryan has extensive experience in both networking infrastructure and the financial services industry. Prior to the IEX Group, he has worked for RBC Capital Markets, Switch and Data, BT Radianz, Qwest and MCI.

Education 
Ryan graduated from Fairfield University in 1996 with a Bachelor's degree in International Studies.  During his time at Fairfield, Ryan was a member of the cross country team and he was the school mascot, Lucas the Stag.

Flash Boys
Since Michael Lewis' book Flash Boys: A Wall Street Revolt was released in March 2014, Ryan has experienced rising popularity. As a networking infrastructure expert, Ryan shared his knowledge of colocation and high-frequency trading with Lewis, which became a large focus in Flash Boys.  Ryan does not believe all high-frequency trading is bad, but there are certain strategies in high-frequency that Ryan believes front-run large, institutional orders.

References

External links
 IEX Group
 

Fairfield University alumni
1974 births
Living people
Royal Bank of Canada people
British Telecom people